Neal Francis (born Neal Francis O’Hara on September 4, 1988) is an American singer, songwriter, and pianist.  Influenced by classic New Orleans artists such as Dr. John, the Meters, and Allen Toussaint,  in addition to Sly Stone, Billy Preston, and Curtis Mayfield, he released his first album in 2019.  His second album,  In Plain Sight --  a  "revelatory blast of soul, R&B, and off-the-rails piano jams" -- was released on ATO Records in 2021.

Early life and education
Francis was born in Livingston, New Jersey and raised in Oak Park, Illinois, a suburb of Chicago. He began playing the piano when he was a very young child, mimicking the sounds he heard on television.  He started taking piano lessons with a classical teacher when he was four, and at 12, drawn to the blues, he began studying with boogie-woogie pianist Erwin Helfer.He played in his first band, the Reverend Funk Connection, in high school, and as a teenager sat in with blues artists at Chicago clubs.  He briefly attended the University of Illinois at Chicago, where he studied architecture.

Career

Mud Morganfield, The Heard, Changes
After graduating from high school, Francis played live dates with prominent blues artists including singer Mud Morganfield, the oldest son of Muddy Waters.  In 2012, he joined The Heard, an instrumental funk band, and became the band's primary songwriter.  A heavy drinker, and "addicted to everything",  Francis was kicked out of the band in 2015. After getting sober he decided to go solo.  

In 2017, with bassist Mike Starr and drummer PJ Howard from The Heard, Francis began recording his first album, Changes, at producer Sergio Rios' Killian Studios in Los Angeles.  In a blog post, he wrote: “Drinking held my music in a half-cocked slingshot. I was always so consumed by drugs and alcohol that I didn’t have the time, money, or creative energy to do it. Sobriety let it loose."  In February 2018, with the basic tracks finished, Francis signed with Karma Chief Records, a subsidiary of Colemine Records.  He spent the following months doing overdubs in Chicago with engineer Mike Novak. (Novak also recorded demos for the project, which were released as Changes (Demos) in 2021.) 

Changes was released in September 2019. It received significant praise from music critics, and made Album of the Year lists at radio stations including KEXP, KCRW, KDHX, WYCE, and Indie 102.3.

In Plain Sight, Sentimental Garbage
While touring in support of Changes, Francis and his longtime girlfriend broke up. When he returned to Chicago he moved into St. Peter’s United Church of Christ, where he had once worked as a music minister.  He said that a combination of sleep deprivation and emotional exhaustion emboldened him to ask if he could stay at the parsonage.

Francis signed with ATO Records in 2020.  He began working on his second album, In Plain Sight, during the first lockdown of the Covid-19 pandemic.    The album was recorded in a full studio attached to the parsonage that Francis built with his bandmates.  Collaborating once again with Rios, In Plain Sight was recorded entirely on analog tape in a full recording studio using several analog tape machines (including a  TASCAM 388 and Tascam MS-16). The band recorded the album with Rios between September and December 2020; overdubs were completed in January 2021. Grammy Award-winner Dave Fridmann mixed the album later that spring.  

The album’s first single, “Can't Stop the Rain” (featuring Derek Trucks on slide guitar), was released on August 17, 2021.It was followed by “Alameda Apartments”, “Prometheus” and “Problems.” The full album debuted on November 5th, 2021.

Among other media outlets, In Plain Sight  was praised by KCRW (“an unapologetically joyful, electric feel that makes for just the jolt to the system we needed"); Rolling Stone (“Francis captures a sound that's somewhere between Elton John and Little Feat”); and Uproxx (“lovers of Dr. John, Leon Russell, and The Meters will immediately feel at home amid Francis’ fat-bottomed, bluesy bangers”). 

The first radio single from In Plain Sight was “Can't Stop The Rain."  It was the most added song on Adult Alternative Radio the week it debuted.  It also spent 26 weeks on the Americana chart.

In November 2022 Francis released the EP Sentimental Garbage. It includes songs recorded during the original album sessions for In Plain Sight at St. Peter’s as well as cover songs recorded for the online music blog Aquarium Drunkard.  Sentimental Garbage was the working title for In Plain Sight.

Discography 
 Changes (2019)
 "Don't Call Me No More" / "How Have I Lived (Reprise)" (2020)
  Changes (Demos) EP (2021)
 In Plain Sight (2021)
Sentimental Garbage EP (2022)

References

External links

American pianists

People from Livingston, New Jersey
American singer-songwriters
1988 births
Living people